Natalya Voronova (née Pomoshchnikova; born July 9, 1965) is a retired Russian sprint athlete who competed in the 100 and 200 metres for the Soviet Union and later Russia. A three time Olympian, she won an Olympic bronze medal in the 4 x 100 metres relay in 1988. She also won the 1992 World Cup 100 metres title, and a gold medal in the 4 x 100 metres relay at the 1993 World Championships.

Born Natalya Pomoschnikova in 1965, she trained at Burevestnik in Moscow. In 1984 she won the Soviet Championship 100 m title (tied with irina Slyusar). Four years later, she competed for the Soviet Union at the 1988 Olympic Games held in Seoul, South Korea, where she finished sixth in the 100 metres final and won a bronze medal in the 4 x 100 meters relay with her team mates Lyudmila Kondratyeva, Galina Malchugina and Marina Zhirova. In 1992, now competing under her married name of Voronova, she won the 100 metres at the IAAF World Cup in Havana and also finished second in the 200 metres behind Marie-Jose Perec. In 1993, she won a World Championship gold in the 4 × 100 m relay for Russia. She also finished sixth in both the 100 m and 200m finals. At her second Olympics in 1996, she again finished sixth in the 100 metres final. She concluded her international career by competing at her third Olympics in 2000.

She retired after the Olympic season in 2000.

Personal bests
100 metres - 10.98 (1988)
200 metres - 22.35 (1993)

International competitions

National titles
Soviet Athletics Championships
100 m: 1984
Russian Athletics Championships
100 m: 1992, 1993, 1994
200 m: 1992

See also
List of Olympic medalists in athletics (women)
List of 1988 Summer Olympics medal winners
List of World Athletics Championships medalists (women)
List of IAAF World Indoor Championships medalists (women)
List of European Athletics Championships medalists (women)
List of 100 metres national champions (women)
4 × 100 metres relay at the World Championships in Athletics

References

1965 births
Living people
Soviet female sprinters
Russian female sprinters
Olympic female sprinters
Olympic athletes of Russia
Olympic athletes of the Soviet Union
Olympic bronze medalists for the Soviet Union
Olympic bronze medalists in athletics (track and field)
Athletes (track and field) at the 1988 Summer Olympics
Athletes (track and field) at the 1996 Summer Olympics
Athletes (track and field) at the 2000 Summer Olympics
Medalists at the 1988 Summer Olympics
Goodwill Games medalists in athletics
Competitors at the 1998 Goodwill Games
Universiade medalists in athletics (track and field)
Universiade bronze medalists for the Soviet Union
Medalists at the 1989 Summer Universiade
World Athletics Championships athletes for the Soviet Union
World Athletics Championships athletes for Russia
World Athletics Championships medalists
World Athletics Championships winners
World Athletics Indoor Championships medalists
IAAF Continental Cup winners
European Athletics Championships medalists
Soviet Athletics Championships winners
Russian Athletics Championships winners
Burevestnik (sports society) athletes